Bartholomeus de Glanvilla was a Franciscan friar who died around 1360. He was at some point confused with Bartholomeus Anglicus, another Franciscan friar who lived a century earlier.

References

English Franciscans
Year of birth missing
1360 deaths